Samuel Clarence Williams (October 13, 1922 – August 8, 2007) was an American Negro league pitcher between 1947 and 1952.

A native of Ketona, Alabama, Williams served in the United States Army during World War II. He made his Negro leagues debut in 1947 for the Birmingham Black Barons. Williams got the start in Game 6 of the 1948 Negro American League championship series for Birmingham, and went 8.1 innings in a Birmingham loss. He played with the Black Barons through 1950, played in Mexico in 1951, and returned to the Barons in 1952, but finished the season with the Brandon Greys of the Mandak League. Williams went on to play minor league baseball for the Oklahoma City Indians, Pampa Oilers, Eugene Emeralds and San Jose JoSox through 1956, then played two more seasons in Mexico before retiring. He died in San Jose, California in 2007 at age 84.

References

External links
 and Seamheads
 Samuel Williams biography from Society for American Baseball Research (SABR)

1922 births
2007 deaths
Birmingham Black Barons players
United States Army personnel of World War II
20th-century African-American sportspeople
Baseball pitchers
21st-century African-American people
African Americans in World War II
African-American United States Army personnel